Ephraim Sidon (born February 26, 1946) is an Israeli author, playwright, and satirist, noted for both his satirical work and his children's books.

Biography
Sidon was born in Jerusalem in 1946 and today lives in Tel Aviv with his family, where he continues to play a central role in Israeli culture.

Professional and literary career
In the early 1970s he collaborated with some of Israel’s most notable writers and satirists publishing a student newspaper and throughout the 1970s this group went on to create some of Israel's most original and diverse work for newspapers and television. In 1974, they created the first satirical cult program for Israeli Television, Nikui Rosh. He then went on to write Zehu Ze; one of Israeli television's biggest comical successes to date. In addition to his work for newspapers and television he wrote vastly for the stage.

In the 1990s Sidon gained status as the top writer for the Israeli Channel 2 satirical puppet show Chartzufim, the Israeli version of Spitting Image. This program mocked the Israeli government mainly during the governments of Barak and Netanyahu. Sidon continued playing a major role in the satirical front of Israel’s main publications and enjoyed wide following with weekly satirical columns in leading newspapers, including a much-acclaimed weekly sketch based on Biblical Stories.

However, Sidon is most loved and acknowledged for his children’s books, with their imaginative characters, rhyme and strong underlying morals. He has published 25 books for children, which are part of the Israeli theatrical cannon. His most notable books include the bestselling Baldy Heights and Uzu and Muzu from Kakaruzu. His books have been widely translated.

Awards
In 2004, Sidon was a co-recipient (jointly with David Grossman and Haya Shenhav) of the Bialik Prize for literature.

See also

List of Bialik Prize recipients

References

External links
http://www.jacketflap.com/persondetail.asp?person=47232

1946 births
Living people
Israeli male dramatists and playwrights
Israeli children's writers